Kezang is a Tibetan name that may refer to
Kezang Dorji (born 1989), Bhutanese rapper and social worker
Kezang Wangdi, Bhutanese footballer 
Kezang Wangmo, Bhutanese actress, poet, singer and dancer 
Zheng Kezang (1662–1681), prince and regency of Kingdom of Tungning